= Bammigatti =

Village in Karnataka, southwest India

- Village
- Location in Karnataka, India Bammigatti (India)
- Coordinates: 15°05′N 74°59′E
- Country: India
- State: Karnataka
- District: Dharwad

Government
  - Body: Gram panchayat

Population (2011)
  - Total: 3,731

Languages
  - Official: Kannada
- Time zone: UTC+5:30 (IST)
- ISO 3166 code: IN-KA
- Vehicle registration: KA
- Website: karnataka.gov.in

Bammigatti is a village in Dharwad district of Karnataka, India.

== Demographics ==
As of the 2011 Census of India there were 806 households in Bammigatti and a total population of 3,731 consisting of 1,945 males and 1,786 females. There were 424 children ages 0-6.
